Simone Brentana (1656 – 9 June 1742) was an Italian painter of the Baroque period, active in Verona. He was born in Venice to Domenico Brentana, but became orphaned by age nine. After a prolonged desultory education in various fields including music, he trained as a painter in Venice with Pietro Negri, frequenting the Accademia di Belle Arti, moving in 1685 to Verona, where most of his paintings are located.

Among his pupils were Antonio Baroni, Michelangelo Spada, Tommaso Dossi, Antonio Elenetti, Giovanni Battista Marcola, and Lodovico Buffetti.

Sources

1656 births
1742 deaths
17th-century Italian painters
Italian male painters
18th-century Italian painters
Painters from Verona
Painters from Venice
Italian Baroque painters
18th-century Italian male artists